Yazlık is a small village in Tarsus district of Mersin Province, Turkey. It is situated in the southern slopes of the Taurus Mountains to the west of Turkish state highway . The population of Yazlık was 88 as of 2012.

References

Villages in Tarsus District